Acraga obscura is a moth of the family Dalceridae. It is found in southern Brazil and Uruguay. The habitat consists of warm temperate moist, subtropical wet and subtropical moist forests.

Description 

The length of the forewings is 9–12 mm. The forewings are dark to golden brown and the hindwings are golden brown (lighter than the forewings). Adults are on wing in January, March, from May to July, in October and December.

References

External links 

Dalceridae
Moths described in 1896